Tolon (Toloon) is a rural locality (a selo) in Khadansky Rural Okrug of Suntarsky District in the Sakha Republic, Russia, located  from Suntar, the administrative center of the district, and  from Agdary, the administrative center of the rural okrug. It had no recorded population as of the 2010 Census and the 2002 Census.

References

Notes

Sources
Official website of the Sakha Republic. Registry of the Administrative-Territorial Divisions of the Sakha Republic. Suntarsky District. 

Rural localities in Suntarsky District